Uthrada Rathri is a 1978 Indian Malayalam film, directed by Balachandra Menon, produced by L. Rajalekshmi Kunjamma, and starring Madhu, Shobha, Sukumaran and Nangasserry Sasi. The film has musical score by Jaya Vijaya.The movie deals with the subject Hypochondriasis, a condition in which a person is excessively and unduly worried about having a serious illness, which is very rarely discussed seriously in movies.It is a lost film.

Cast
 
Madhu 
Shobha 
Sukumaran 
Nangasserry Sasi
Kaviyoor Ponnamma 
Sankaradi 
Adoor Bhavani 
Aranmula Ponnamma 
Kanakadurga 
Kuthiravattam Pappu 
Mallika Sukumaran 
Ravi Menon

Soundtrack
The music was composed by Jaya Vijaya.

References

External links
 

1978 films
1970s Malayalam-language films
Films directed by Balachandra Menon
Films scored by Jaya Vijaya